Kostas Hatzichristos or Costas Hajihristos (1921 – October 3, 2001) was a Greek actor.

Biography 
He was born in Thessaloniki, Greece, to a large family of thirteen members, he was the eleventh child. His parents were from Constantinople (today Istanbul), and they were initially relocated to Kavala, moved to Thessaloniki thereafter, and later moved to the northern Athens suburb of Pagkrati.

The young Kostas studied initially at the Sergeants Major Military School of Syros and finished his studies in the Kavala. He worked in the variety theatre Missouri in Piraeus and with the Nitsa Gaitanaki company where he played in The Grouch by Dimitris Psathas. From 1945 until 1948, he worked in an operetta company owned by Paraskevas Oikonomou and appeared in the Pefka variety with Oikonomidis and Oasia with Mimis Traiforos. In 1949‒50, he participated in Koula Nikolaidou's musical company at the Verdun theatre at Alexandras Avenue.

At the Verdun theatre, Hatzichristos acted for his first time in his successful run in the role of a villager character called Thymios, a role inspired by Kostas Nikolaidis, brother of his wife Mary Nikolaidou. Hatzichristos first screen appearance was in the movie The Knights' Castle in 1952 with Giorgos Asimakopoulos and Nikos Tsiforos. At the same time, he was successful at the theatre founded in 1952 his own theatrical troupe and in 1960 became theatrical entrepreneur founded his own theatre Hatzichristos Theatre premiered on 18 February 1960, later renamed as the Treatre Orfeas, at Panepistimiou Avenue in the Athens neighborhood of Akadimia. One of the greatest successes in his career was in the movie What a Mess in 1963, and also in the movie Τhe Man Who Returned from the Plates in 1969 with Anna Fonsou and Dionysis Papagiannopoulos. He also produced three movies and directed eight.    

His theatrical work continued until 1983. After a long period of absence he returned into the theatre in 1994‒95 era and played in the local Hatzichristos Theatre. His difficult years begun when his third wife, Eleni Pantazi died at the age of 42. 

Kostas Hatzichristos died by cancer on 3 October 2001, suffering from economic problems. He was interred at public expense at First Cemetery of Athens on 5 October 2001.

Personal life 
He was engaged with the actress Ntina Trianti with whom they had starred in several movies together. His first marriage was done during the Axis occupation of Greece with a woman named Nitsa who was from Naousa, Imathia. They were living together for many years. In 1949 he married Mary Nikolaidou with whom he had one daughter, Teta Hatzichristou who was married actor Petros Fyssoun with whom he had one daughter, actress Ania Fyssoum. In 1955 he married actress Ketty Diridaoua and divorced in 1975, with whom he had one daughter Marialena Hatzichristou. His third wife was Eleni Pantazi. His last wife was Voula Arvanitaki-Hatzichristou.

Filmography

Selected theatrical plays

References

External links
 
  at Discogs
  at Retrodb

1921 births
2001 deaths
Deaths from cancer in Greece
Greek male film actors
Greek comedians
Male actors from Athens
Actors from Thessaloniki
20th-century comedians